Satish C. Sekar (born September 1963) is a British author and journalist, and a consultant in forensic evidence. Sekar has specialised since the 1990s in the investigation of miscarriages of justice. His work has been published in newspapers including The Guardian, The Independent and Private Eye, and he has also worked for television documentaries including Panorama and Trial and Error. He has worked on a number of high-profile cases in the UK, including those of the Cardiff Newsagent Three, Gary Mills and Tony Poole (wrongly convicted in 1990 for the murder of Hensley Wiltshire), the M25 Three, and Michelle and Lisa Taylor (wrongly convicted in 1992 for the murder of Alison Shaughnessy). He also worked on the case of the Merthyr Tydfil Two (Donna Clarke and Annette Hewins), presenting scientific findings to South Wales Police regarding the fire that resulted in the police's expert accepting his conclusions that the petrol bought by Hewins that night was not the petrol used in the fatal fire. 
In 1992, his work helped overturn the convictions of the Cardiff Three and while researching a book about the case, Fitted In: The Cardiff 3 and the Lynette White Inquiry, he uncovered errors in the original evaluation of forensic evidence from the crime scene. His submissions to the Home Office about the DNA evidence were instrumental in reopening the case and the eventual extraction of a DNA profile which led to the arrest and conviction of the real killer, Jeffrey Gafoor, in 2003. The Australian and New Zealand Journal of Criminology said that Sekar's "extraordinary work on the case of the Cardiff 3 [put] academic criminology to shame."

In 2010 he founded The Fitted-In Project, a not for profit organisation that conducts projects on justice issues that have not had the attention they deserve. Sekar's fifth book on justice issues, Bad Form: How Tariffs Protect the Guilty and Punish the Innocent will be published in 2022. It highlights the injustice of the real killer of Lynette White being treated more leniently than Yusef Abdullahi and Tony Paris, two of the innocent men Gafoor knowingly allowed to be wrongfully convicted. It will also show how judges have powers that have never been used, to punish real perpetrators appropriately. The real murderer of Lynette White, Jeffrey Gafoor has been moved to an open prison. His fourth application for parole was refused in May 2011. His next application will take place between 18–24 months later.
The Fitted-In Project highlights other vindication cases - cases where the real perpetrator has been brought to justice after a miscarriage of justice, or if the likely perpetrator is deceased, their involvement has been accepted by the authorities. There are eight vindication cases in homicides in Britain and many more around the world.

Fitted-In and Sekar were the only media and journalists in the world excluded from the Lynette White Inquiry Police Corruption Trial, which collapsed in 2011, largely because of the failures of the Crown Prosecution Service. The Fitted-In Project argues that there should be a Truth and Justice Commission to establish exactly why this inquiry was mishandled from start to finish and to facilitate the necessary changes throughout the criminal justice system to prevent repetition. Sekar was appointed CEO of the Fitted-In Project http://www.fittedin.org in 2012.
Four of Sekar's books have been published to date. Fitted In:The Cardiff 3 and the Lynette White Inquiry (1998); The Cardiff Five: Innocent Beyond Any Doubt (2012 - 2nd Edition now available); Trials and Tribulations: Innocence Matters? (2017)and Forensic Pathology: Preventing Wrongs (2020). E-versions of the latter two are available through Kindle. His fifth book will be published in February 2021.
He also works in sports journalism and established a not for profit organisation. Sekar has highlighted the lack of assistance for sporting icons, especially in Africa for the best part of a decade. Recently he organised a series of Zoom events to commemorate the 30th anniversary of the end of the second trial of the Cardiff Five for the murder of Lynette White. Three discussions are available on The Fitted-In Project's YouTube channel.
He also organised the commemoration discussions of Zambian sports icon, Godfrey Chitalu's achievements on 22 October 2020, which would have been the 73rd birthday of the double world record-holder. He traced and interviewed the goalkeeper who conceded the African Champion Clubs records (most goals in a tie and most in a match in the African Cup of Champions Clubs in the preliminary round of that competition in 1972), Lebohang Nteko 49 years after Chitalu set the records. It was the first interview Nteko had granted about Chitalu's records in almost half a century. Nteko's recollections were verified by newspaper reports at the time and by those who attended the first leg in Maseru in January 1972. Chitalu's teammate, Richard Stephenson confirmed details of both matches, including the record, seven in a tie, that Chitalu scored in the second leg in February 1972.

Early life
Sekar was educated at Reynolds High School, Acton, and Thames Polytechnic, where he studied sociology. He has one brother, Chandra Sekar, a barrister. 
After a long-running dispute with Barclays Bank, the Financial Ombudsman Service, which is funded by institutions that it investigates, offered a derisory amount in compensation and refused to order the bank to investigate whether its staff had committed criminal offences. Barclays had permitted a third party to gain control of Mr Sekar's accounts without his consent. Barclays' reckless conduct and that of the Ombudsman has never been addressed. This has enabled the recipient of that unlawfully obtained information to attempt to renege on contractual obligations, a dispute facilitated by Barclays' conduct.
Barclays also recklessly sabotaged a legal action that Mr Sekar was taking against South Wales Police in 2012. A firm of solicitors was allowed to impose useless instructions that they wanted on Mr Sekar without his consent by the Legal Ombudsman, thereby overturning centuries of law without a hearing. Instructions are the sole right of the client to set but a lawyer at this firm imposed the instructions that she wanted without the client's consent. She refused to allow the crucial meeting to be recorded, which prevented any actual record of what was said. There is no signed record of these alleged instructions either.
Her actions sabotaged Mr Sekar's case and allowed South Wales Police to ignore copyright law and steal cooperation for processes designed to prevent the full truth about the notorious Lynette White Inquiry from ever emerging.

Bibliography
Fitted In: The Cardiff 3 and the Lynette White Inquiry (1997)
The Cardiff Five: Innocent Beyond Any Doubt (2012) Waterside Books
The Cardiff Five: Innocent Beyond Any Doubt (2017) 2nd Edition (Waterside Books)
 Trials and Tribulations- Innocence Matters? (2017)
 Forensic Pathology - Preventing Wrongs (2019)
 Bad Form - How Tariffs Protect the Guilty and Punish the Innocent (to be published in 2022)

References

External links
The Fitted-In Project — Campaign group founded by Satish Sekar and dedicated to highlighting miscarriages of justice and promoting policy changes in the criminal justice system.

British male journalists
British non-fiction writers
British writers of Indian descent
1963 births
Living people
British investigative journalists